Functional Materials Letters is an interdisciplinary, peer-reviewed journal published by World Scientific with articles relating to the synthesis, behavior, characterization and application of functional materials. These are materials designed to respond to changes in their environments. Topics covered include ferroelectric, magneto-optical, sustainable energy and shape memory materials.

Established in 2008 as a quarterly journal, Funct. Mater. Lett. switched to bimonthly in 2013.

Abstracting and indexing 
The journal is indexed in Inspec. According to the Journal Citation Reports, the journal has a 2020 impact factor of 2.17.

References

External links

Materials science journals
World Scientific academic journals
English-language journals
Bimonthly journals
Publications established in 2008